Issoufou Saidou-Djermakoye (born 10 July 1920 in Dosso, Niger; died 30 June 2000 in Paris) was a politician from Niger who was elected to the French Senate in 1958. He was later United Nations Under-Secretary-General in charge of the Department of Political Affairs, Trusteeship and Decolonization.

References  

 Page on the French Senate website 

Nigerien politicians
French Senators of the Fourth Republic
1920 births
2000 deaths
Under-Secretaries-General of the United Nations
Senators of French West Africa
Nigerien officials of the United Nations
Nigerien expatriates in France